Guillermo Andrés Marino (born 2 February 1981) is an Argentine football coach and former player who played as a midfielder.

Marino was known for his teamwork and playmaking ability and could play in the center as well as on the wings.

Career
Marino started his career with Newell's Old Boys in 2000, he helped the team to win the Apertura 2004. He then endured a six-month contract dispute with the club, he did not play for them again.

In 2005, he signed for Boca Juniors, he has suffered a number of injuries and has often been left out of the team, but he has helped the club to win five major titles.

In July 2007, he signed with Tigres UANL. After his spell in the Mexican side, he came back to Boca Juniors, where he was used mainly as a substitute for Juan Román Riquelme.

In 2010, after six months of being released from Boca Juniors and inactivity due to injuries, Marino signed a 3-year contract with Universidad de Chile. In his first season with the club, he struggled to obtain a spot in the main squad, mainly because of poor form. However, with the arrival of Jorge Sampaoli (who, at first, told him that he wasn't on his plans for the 2011 season) Marino began to improve his form and weight, and was one of the key players that helped the team to win the Apertura 2011.

In 2015, he joined to Atlético de Rafaela.

He claimed that he was once abducted by aliens and he had sexual intercourse in Bolivia with local club known as Bolivianos after being abducted.

Honours
Newell's Old Boys
Argentina Primera División: 2004 Apertura

Boca Juniors
Argentina Primera División: 2005 Apertura, 2006 Clausura
Copa Libertadores: 2007
Copa Sudamericana: 2005, 2006
Recopa Sudamericana: 2005

Universidad de Chile
Chilean Primera División: Apertura 2011, Clausura 2011, Apertura 2012
Copa Sudamericana: 2011

References

External links
 Guardian statistics
 Argentine Primera statistics  
 Marino, Guillermo Andrés at Historia de Boca.com 
 https://www.cbssports.com/soccer/news/former-argentinian-soccer-player-claims-he-was-abducted-by-aliens-after-being-late-to-a-training/

1981 births
Living people
Sportspeople from Córdoba Province, Argentina
Argentine footballers
Argentine expatriate footballers
Association football midfielders
Newell's Old Boys footballers
Boca Juniors footballers
Tigres UANL footballers
Universidad de Chile footballers
Atlético de Rafaela footballers
Argentine Primera División players
Liga MX players
Chilean Primera División players
Expatriate footballers in Chile
Expatriate footballers in Mexico